BF42 may refer to:

Battlefield 1942
Battlefield 2042
Battlefield 2142